Yun Guangzhong (born June 1960) is a former Chinese politician who spent his entire career in north China's Inner Mongolia. He is of Mongol descent. As of June 2019 he was under investigation by China's top anti-corruption agency. Previously he served as party chief of the capital city Hohhot. Prior to that, he was vice-chairman of the Inner Mongolia between 2014 and 2017, party chief of Ordos City between 2011 and 2014, mayor of Ordos between 2008 and 2011, party chief of Manzhouli between 2006 and 2008, and mayor of Manzhouli between 2004 and 2006.

He was a delegate to the 18th and 19th National Congress of the Chinese Communist Party.

Education
Yun was born in Tumed Left Banner, Hohhot, Inner Mongolia, in June 1960. In September 1989, he entered China University of Political Science and Law, where he majored in law. He earned his master's degree in agricultural economy from Inner Mongolia Agricultural University in January 2001. He also received his master's degree in management from the technology and innovation courses jointly organized by Tsinghua University and Australian National University in December 2007.

Career
After the Cultural Revolution, he entered politics in October 1977. He served in various posts in the Public Security Bureau and then Procuratorate of Tumed Left Banner before serving as its executive deputy head in December 1993. He served as magistrate of Helin County from April 1997 to November 1998, and party chief, the top political position in the county, from November 1998 to January 2001. He was head of the Organization Department of Wuhai in January 2001, and held that office until November 2003. He became the deputy party chief and mayor of Manzhouli, a county-level city under the jurisdiction of Hulunbuir, in November 2003, and then party chief, the top political position in the city, beginning in October 2006. In February 2008, he was transferred to Ordos City and appointed deputy party chief, rising to party chief in February 2011. He was promoted to vice-chairman of the Inner Mongolia Autonomous Region People's Government in January 2014, a position he held until January 2017. He was appointed party chief of the capital city Hohhot in November 2016, and held the position for almost three years until he was sacked for graft.

Investigation
On June 11, 2019, he was put under investigation for alleged "serious violations of discipline and laws" by the Central Commission for Discipline Inspection (CCDI), the party's internal disciplinary body, and the National Supervisory Commission, the highest anti-corruption agency of China. On 1 December, he had been expelled from the Chinese Communist Party and removed from public office. He was taken away on 31 December. On July 16, 2020, the Dalian Intermediate People's Court held a public hearing on the case of Yun Guangzhong. Prosecutors accused Yun of taking advantage of his various positions, accepting money and gifts worth 94.32 million yuan (about $13.48 million). On November 3, he was sentenced to 14 years in prison for taking bribes and was also fined 5.5 million yuan ($822,220).

References

1960 births
Living people
People from Tumed Left Banner
China University of Political Science and Law alumni 
Inner Mongolia Agricultural University alumni
People's Republic of China politicians from Inner Mongolia
Chinese Communist Party politicians from Inner Mongolia